This is a list of episodes for Season 9 of Late Night with Conan O'Brien, which aired from September 4, 2001 to August 16, 2002.

Series overview

Season 9

References

Episodes (season 09)